John Patrick Horgan (26 May 1929 – 6 October 2021) was a British-American actor, of Irish descent,  born in Nottingham, England. He was known for playing the role of Dr. John Morrison in the soap opera television series The Doctors.  He completed an unabridged reading of Finnegans Wake in 1985 for the Library of Congress. Horgan died in October 2021, at the age of 92.

Filmography
The Edge of Night (1956)
The Battle of the River Plate (1956)
As the World Turns (1956)
The Doctors (1963)
The Evil of Frankenstein (1964)
The Thomas Crown Affair (1968)
The Wild Wild West (1968)
Star Trek (1968)
One Life to Live (1968)
Ryan's Hope (1975)
Zelig (1983)
George Washington (1984)
The Curse of the Jade Scorpion (2001)

References

External links 

 

1929 births
2021 deaths
20th-century American male actors
20th-century English male actors
Actors from Nottingham
American male film actors
American male television actors
American male soap opera actors
English emigrants to the United States
English male film actors
English male soap opera actors
English people of Irish descent